FIFA, through several companies, sold the rights for the broadcast of 2002 FIFA World Cup to the following broadcasters.

Television

References

External links 

broadcasting rights
FIFA World Cup broadcasting rights